Lee Sung-yeol (born August 27, 1991), known mononymously as Sungyeol, is a South Korean singer and actor. He is a member of the South Korean boy band Infinite and its sub-group Infinite F.

Biography
Lee Sung-yeol was born and raised in Yongin, Gyeonggi-do. He has a younger brother named Lee Dae-yeol, who is also signed with Woollim Entertainment and is a member and leader of the boy group Golden Child which debuted in August 2017.

On February 15, 2013, Lee graduated from Daekyeung University, majoring in Applied Music with fellow Infinite members Sung-kyu,  L, Dong-woo and Hoya.

Career

Pre-debut
Prior to debut, Lee appeared in the television series as an extra such as Boys Over Flowers, Good Job, Good Job, and Jolly Widows. He originally planned to debut as an actor, and was once an actor trainee under SM Academy.

2010–2013: Career beginnings

Lee was the last member to join Infinite. On June 9, 2010, Lee made his debut as a vocalist of Infinite with their first EP, First Invasion.

Lee made his acting debut in 2011 with the drama While You Were Sleeping.

On October 21, 2013, Lee was cast as a main character in the web drama Love for Ten: Generation of Youth with 4Minute's Son Ji-hyun.

2014–2016: Infinite F and acting roles

In 2014, Lee and bandmate Woo-hyun were cast in the KBS2 drama Hi! School-Love On with rising child actress Kim Sae-ron. The drama was broadcast from July 11 to December 19, 2014.

Lee and bandmates  L and Sungjong formed a subgroup called Infinite F and were announced during the "One Great Step Returns" encore concert. They performed their song "Heartthrob" from the Hi! School: Love On soundtrack. Their first officially released song, "Crazy", was included on Infinite's second album, Season 2. They made their debut in Japan with their first single album, Koi No Sign, on November 19, 2014, following in Korea with their first single album, Azure, on December 2, 2014.

On May 22, 2015, Lee was confirmed to be in the cast of JTBC's D-Day.

2017–2020: Transition to lead roles
In 2017, Lee was cast as the male lead in a one-act drama called Temporary Cold Case Task Force, with rookie actress Lee Ye Hyun. Lee starred in the KBS1 daily drama Love Returns.

In 2019, Lee starred in the horror film 0.0MHz alongside Apink’s Eun-ji, based on the webtoon with the same name.

Lee enlisted as part of his mandatory military service as an active duty soldier on March 26, 2019. He was released early on October 4, 2020 due to COVID-19 precautions, and was officially discharged on October 27, 2020.

2021–present: Departure from Woollim
On March 31, 2021, Lee departed from Woollim Entertainment after his contract expired.

On June 7, 2021, Lee signed with Management 2sang.

Discography

Filmography

Film

Television series

Television shows

Theater

References

1991 births
Living people
People from Yongin
South Korean male singers
South Korean male idols
South Korean J-pop singers
South Korean pop singers
South Korean male television actors
Infinite (group) members